Benair is a rural locality in the South Burnett Region, Queensland, Australia.

History 
The Benair area opened for settlement circa 1914.

Boonare State School opened on 31 July 1911 but was renamed Benair State School later that year. It closed on 9 December 1977. 

A Lutheran church congregation formed in 1917 and erected St Paul's Lutheran Church with an associated cemetery in 1921 at 8965 Bunya Highway. In 1950 a new church was built. In 1958 a church hall was added by relocated by relocating a former army building from Gregory Terrace in Brisbane. The church closed in 1977 and the church building was relocated to become a chapel at Mount Tamborine. After the church closed, the site became known as the Peace Lutheran Hall and Cemetery. Although listed on the South Burnett Local Heritage Register, approval to demolish the hall was given in 2017 but the cemetery had to be preserved.

References 

South Burnett Region
Localities in Queensland